Next Enti? is a 2018 Indian Telugu-language romantic comedy film directed by Kunal Kohli, making his Telugu debut. The film stars Tamannaah, Sundeep Kishan, and Navdeep. It is based on When Harry Met Sally.... The music was composed by Leon James with cinematography by Manish Chandra Bhatt, and editing by Anil Kumar Bonthu. The film released on 7 December 2018. The film's title is based on a song from Nenu Local (2017).

Plot 
Tammy (Tamannaah) is a modern girl who breaks up with her boyfriend as he does not believe in true love. This is the time when she meets a marketing executive named Sanju (Sundeep Kishan) and connects with him instantly. They start living together, but Tammy is against a physical relationship with Sanju. This upsets Sanju, and he breaks up with Tammy. During this time, Tammy starts liking Krish (Navdeep), a businessman with a past, while Sanju also moves on. Tammy and Krish begin a relationship, and this time, she believes that Krish is the one for her. The rest of the story is what happens between Tammy, Sanju, and Krish.

Cast 

 Tamannaah as Tammy
 Sundeep Kishan as Sanju
 Navdeep as Krish
 Poonam Kaur as Prachiti
 Sharat Babu as Prakash, Tammy's father
 Harsha Vardhan as Sanju's friend
 Larissa Bonesi as Roshini
 Venkat Mikkilineni as Mahesh
 Milla as Baby Tammy
 Prajnaa Kumar and Laila Naim  as Young Tammy

Production 
The film is Bollywood director Kunal Kohli's first Telugu film. Principal photography began in London in late-May 2017. The title Next Enti was revealed on 8 November 2018.

Soundtrack 

Leon James makes his Telugu debut with this film.

Release 
Next Enti was released in 7 December 2018.

Reception 
Hemanth Kumar writing for Firstpost rated the film 1 out of five, and criticised film's poor writing. "Kunal Kohli’s writing has the same annoying after effect of a tuning fork that’s thrusted into your ears. The problem isn’t with how ‘talkative’ everyone is, but it’s more about what the film wants to say and how much it wants to say within two hours of its runtime," Kumar added. India Today critic Janani K, rated 1.5/5 and stated, "Bollywood director Kunal Kohli's debut Telugu film Next Enti tries to be a contemporary new age rom-com, but falls flat on its face." Neeshitha Nyayapati of The Times of India also rated 1.5 of 5, writing, "The conversations seem forced, so do most of the scenes. The character developments are so inconsistent that when they finally flesh out in the second half, it almost makes one wish they go back to being the flat cardboards they were in the first half."

References

External links
 

2010s Telugu-language films
2018 romantic comedy films
Indian remakes of American films
Telugu remakes of Hindi films
Indian romantic comedy films
Films directed by Kunal Kohli